Robert Hamilton McKendry (18 August 1889 – 17 September 1965) was  a former Australian rules footballer who played with Richmond in the Victorian Football League (VFL).

Notes

External links 
		

1889 births
1965 deaths
Australian rules footballers from Victoria (Australia)
Richmond Football Club players